{{Album reviews
| rev1      = Allmusic
| rev1Score =  <ref>{{AllMusic |class=album |id=R21540 |tab=review |label="Dionne Warwick: Promises, Promises > Review" |first=Lindsay |last=Planer|accessdate=November 7, 2012}}</ref>
}}Promises, Promises is the title of a 1968 album by Dionne Warwick, and her eleventh studio album. Like many of her previous albums, it was produced by the songwriting team of Burt Bacharach and Hal David. The album includes three songs from the musical Promises, Promises, for which Bacharach and David wrote the music and lyrics, and which would premiere a month after the album was released: the title song, "Whoever You Are (I Love You)" and "Wanting Things". The album also includes two other Bacharach/David compositions, "This Girl's in Love with You" (which had originally been recorded by Herb Alpert as "This Guy's in Love with You" earlier that year) and "Who Is Gonna Love Me".

The album includes songs from two other musicals of the time: "Where Is Love?" from Oliver!, and "Where Am I Going?" from Sweet Charity.

The title track reached the U.S. Top 20 and No. 7 Easy Listening during the late fall of 1968. "This Girl's in Love with You," the follow-up single, reached number seven in February 1969.

Track listing

Personnel
Dionne Warwick - vocals
Burt Bacharach, Don Sebesky, Peter Matz - arrangements
Phil Ramone - audio engineer
Burt Goldblatt - art direction, cover design
Michael Freeman - front cover photography

 Charts 

References

External linksPromises, Promises'' at Discogs

1968 albums
Dionne Warwick albums
albums arranged by Burt Bacharach
albums arranged by Don Sebesky
albums arranged by Peter Matz
Albums produced by Burt Bacharach
Albums produced by Hal David
Scepter Records albums